Richard Roxburgh (born 23 January 1962) is an Australian actor, writer, producer, and director. He is the recipient of a number of accolades across film, television, and theatre, including three AACTA Awards (including AFI), three Logie Awards, and two Helpmann Awards.

He began his career working with the Sydney Theatre Company. He went on to appear in Australian and international productions such as Baz Luhrmann's films Moulin Rouge! (2001) and Elvis (2022), the ABC series Rake (2010–2018), and the action films Mission: Impossible 2 (2000), The League of Extraordinary Gentlemen (2003), and Van Helsing (2004).

Early life
Roxburgh was born at the Mercy Hospital in Albury, New South Wales, to John (d. July 2011) and Mary Roxburgh; he is the youngest of six children. John was a successful accountant. Roxburgh played Willy Loman in the Albury High School production of Death of a Salesman in 1978.

Roxburgh studied economics at the Australian National University in Canberra, where he resided at Garran Hall and graduated with a B.Ec. in 1984. After graduating from ANU, he decided to become an actor and was admitted to the National Institute of Dramatic Art (NIDA) on his second audition attempt.

Career
Roxburgh began working with the Sydney Theatre Company as soon as he graduated from NIDA.
He came to public attention for his portrayal of New South Wales Police Force detective Roger Rogerson in the 1995 television miniseries Blue Murder. Through the 1990s, he appeared in several Australian film and stage productions including a critically acclaimed turn as Hamlet alongside Geoffrey Rush, Jacqueline McKenzie and David Wenham in the 1994 Company B production at the Belvoir St Theatre in Sydney. In December 2007, he played the lead character, Roland Henning, who suffered writer's block in Michael Gow's play, Toy Symphony, at the Belvoir St Theatre, winning the 2008 Helpmann Award for best male actor in a play.

In 2000, Roxburgh appeared in the first of several international blockbuster films as the main villain's henchman Hugh Stamp in the John Woo-directed Mission: Impossible 2, which was filmed in Sydney. Also filmed in Sydney was Baz Luhrmann's Moulin Rouge! (2001), in which Roxburgh played the Duke of Monroth.

Roxburgh appeared as three iconic characters over the next three years: he played Sherlock Holmes in 2002's The Hound of the Baskervilles, Holmes's nemesis Professor Moriarty in 2003's The League of Extraordinary Gentlemen and Count Dracula in 2004's Van Helsing. He is one of only two actors to have played all three of these characters, the other being Orson Welles, who played them in separate radio programs.

Roxburgh directed his first film, Romulus, My Father starring Eric Bana, released in 2007. This film won the AFI Award in December 2007 and was nominated for several more. In 2008 and 2009, he played the lead role of Art Watkins in the ABC drama series East of Everything.

In July 2010, Roxburgh played former Australian Prime Minister Bob Hawke in a telemovie based on Hawke's life. He reprised the role in the 2020 episode "Terra Nullius" of the Netflix series The Crown.

In November 2010, Roxburgh co-created and began starring in the critically acclaimed ABC1 television comedy-drama series Rake as the brilliant but self-destructive Sydney criminal barrister Cleaver Greene, a role for which he won the Australian Academy of Cinema and Television Arts Award for Best Lead Actor in a Television Drama in 2012. He stars in Matching Jack, which was released in August 2010, and Legend of the Guardians: The Owls of Ga'Hoole, released in September 2010.

Returning to the stage, Roxburgh played Vanya opposite Cate Blanchett, Hugo Weaving and John Bell in Sydney Theatre Company's 2010 production of Anton Chekhov's Uncle Vanya. In 2013, he again performed at the STC with Weaving as the protagonists in Samuel Beckett's play Waiting for Godot, Weaving as Vladimir and Roxburgh as Estragon. In 2014, Roxburgh played the title role in Edmond Rostand's 1897 play Cyrano de Bergerac at the STC. In 2015, Roxburgh appeared in Andrew Upton's adaptation of Chekhov's play Platonov, titled The Present, for the STC. It was directed by John Crowley and featured Cate Blanchett, Jacqueline McKenzie, Marshall Napier, and Toby Schmitz. That production moved in 2016/17 to the Ethel Barrymore Theatre in New York City for the Broadway debut of Roxburgh and the rest of the cast.

Children's literature
Roxburgh wrote and illustrated the well-received, 240-page children's adventure fiction title, Artie and the Grime Wave, published by Allen & Unwin in October 2016.

Personal life

Roxburgh married Italian-born opera singer, actress, blogger, cookbook author, and television cookery show personality Silvia Colloca in 2004. They met on the set of Van Helsing, playing Count Dracula and his bride, respectively. They have three children.

Filmography

Film

Television

Awards and nominations

References

External links

 
 
 
 Eyeforfilm.co.uk – Interview with Richard Roxburgh about Romulus, My Father

1962 births
Australian male film actors
Australian male television actors
Australian male stage actors
Australian film directors
Best Actor AACTA Award winners
Helpmann Award winners
Living people
Logie Award winners
People from Albury, New South Wales
National Institute of Dramatic Art alumni
Australian male voice actors
Blinky Bill
20th-century Australian people
21st-century Australian people
Australian National University alumni